Maria Monica Sacay Cuenco, also known as Monica Cuenco (born November 23, 1994) is the second runner-up of Star Power: Sharon Search For the Next Female Superstar. She is dubbed as "The Charming Biritera of Cebu".  She has landed her biggest break to date, bagging the role of Dorina Pineda in an upcoming theater adaptation of classic viva hits "Bituing Walang Ningning" this June 2015.

Early life
Monica lost both of her parents at a very young age. First her dad to cardiac arrest when she was 4 and then her mom to cervical cancer 11 years ago. After that, Monica lived with her aunt in Ormoc City and found several ways to earn her own money. Aside from singing, she also sold puto cheese and siopao to make ends meet.

In 2010, when she was 15, Monica joined the ABS-CBN talent search series, "Star Power: Sharon’s Search for the Next Female Pop Superstar". Then using the name, Monica Cuenco Sacay, she placed third runner-up while the winner Angeline Quinto in a field that also included Krissel Valdez and K-La Rivera.

The Leyte native was chosen to take on the iconic lead role of Dorina Pineda in an upcoming theater adaptation of the classic drama "Bituing Walang Ningning.”

Tv appearances

Musical

References

External links
 Getting to know Star Power Final 5"

Star Magic
Living people
Participants in Philippine reality television series
1994 births
Singers from Cebu City
Actresses from Cebu
People from Ormoc
Viva Artists Agency
21st-century Filipino singers
21st-century Filipino women singers